Basheer Ahmad Khan Matta is a Pashtun nationalist politician and historian who is a senior leader of the National Democratic Movement (NDM). He is a supporter of the Pashtun Tahafuz Movement (PTM), and was formerly a member of the Senate of Pakistan.

Matta has formerly served as the chairman of the organizing committee and foreign affairs committee of the Awami National Party (ANP). For a time, he also served as the acting provincial president of ANP Khyber Pakhtunkhwa.

Books
Matta is the author of several books in Pashto and English languages. One of his English books is Sher Shah Suri: A Fresh Perspective, which is a historical account of Sher Shah Suri, the 16th-century Afghan ruler who founded the Sur Empire in India.

One of his Pashto books is Da Paktā Waynā (lit. "Paktā's Speech"). It is written in an allegorical format and addressed to the Pashtun nation.

References

Living people
Pashtun people
National Democratic Movement (Pakistan) politicians
Awami National Party politicians
Year of birth missing (living people)